The 1995 All Japan Grand Touring Car Championship was the third season of Japan Automobile Federation GT premiere racing, and the second under the promotion of the GT Association (GTA). It was marked as well as the thirteenth season of a JAF-sanctioned sports car racing championship dating back to the All Japan Sports Prototype Championship. Once again, the GT1 class champion was the #1 Calsonic Nissan Skyline GT-R driven by Masahiko Kageyama, and the GT2 class champion was the #70 Gaikokuya Nissan Skyline driven by Yoshimi Ishibashi and Kaoru Hoshino.

1995 saw the Toyota Supra win its first race in the GT1 category, at Sendai Hi-Land Raceway. The victory came just a week after Masanori Sekiya, driver of the winning Castrol TOM's Toyota Supra, became the first Japanese driver to win the 24 Hours of Le Mans overall. The series made its first official visit to Suzuka Circuit on April 2, 1995.

Schedule

Teams & Drivers

GT1

Season results

Point Ranking

GT1 Class (Top 5)

Drivers

GT2 Class (Top 5)

Drivers

Notes
1.Masahiko Kondō did not met the requirement for minimum distance driven and was ineligible for championship points.

External links

 Super GT/JGTC official race archive 
 1995 season results 

Super GT seasons
JGTC